, ForMemRS, is a Japanese material scientist most known for the discovery of iron-based superconductors.

Career and research 
Hosono is also a pioneer in developing transparent oxide semiconductors: he proposed a material design concept for a transparent amorphous oxide semiconductor (TAOS) with large electron mobility, demonstrated the excellent performance of TAOS thin film transistors for next generation displays and successfully converted a cement constituent 12CaO·7Al2O3 into transparent semiconductor, metal, and eventually superconductors.

Awards and honors
 2009 – Bernd T. Matthias Prize for Superconductivity
 2009 – Medal of Honor (Purple Ribbon)
 2012 – Nishina Memorial Prize
 2013 – Thomson Reuters Citation Laureates
 2015 – Imperial Prize of the Japan Academy
 2016 – Japan Prize
 2017 – Elected a Foreign Member of the Royal Society
2018 – Materials Research Society's Von Hippel Award 
2023 – Eduard Rhein Technology Award

Selected publications
According to the Web of Science, Hideo Hosono has co-authored 5 articles with more than 1000 citations each (as of September 2019):

References

External links
Hideo Hosono (2014) "Impression-Inspired Materials Research", Vimeo Youtube.

1953 births
Living people
Japanese physicists
Academic staff of Tokyo Institute of Technology
People from Saitama Prefecture
Foreign Members of the Royal Society
Tokyo Metropolitan University alumni